Susuwat is a traditional Filipino ethnic Moro weapon. It is light and devastating used by the indigenous people of Mindanao. It is a single blade with a wide tipped and a triple prong designed for forward cutting. The sword is about 24 to 28 inches in length with a hooked grip to prevent slipping when wet.

References

Arnis
Filipino swords
Weapons of the Philippine Army
Malayan swords
Blade weapons